This article lists the general directors of Carabineros de Chile. Carabineros de Chile are the Chilean national police force, who have jurisdiction over the entire national territory of Chile, and dates back to 1927.

The current General Director is General Ricardo Yáñez. He was appointed by President Sebastián Piñera on 19 November 2020.

List

Cuerpo de Carabineros General Commander (1924–1927)

Cuerpo de Carabineros General Director (1927–1931)

Carabineros de Chile General Director (1931–present)

See also
Carabineros de Chile
La Moneda Palace Guard
Ministry of National Defense (Chile)
Ministry of the Interior and Public Security (Chile)

References

1927 establishments in Chile
Law enforcement in Chile
Chilean police officers
Chile